The ME Four-Twelve is an American high-performance concept car that was engineered, developed and produced by Chrysler in 2004. The name is a combination of the Mid-Engine with Four turbochargers on a Twelve cylinder engine.

Background
There were two ME Four-Twelve vehicles produced. The first was an auto show version using performance expertise from Daimler, but with limited operational capabilities. It was designed behind-the-scenes during 2003 by a small team. The auto show vehicle, unveiled at the 2004 North American International Auto Show (NAIAS) in Detroit, took less than one year for design and development. The exterior design was done by American Brian Nielander.

Chrysler announced at the 2004 NAIAS that the ME Four-Twelve was a full running prototype. At the time, key personnel within the Street & Racing Technology group at Chrysler directed by Dan Knott (also responsible for the Dodge Viper, SRT production adaptations such as the Dodge Neon SRT-4 and Dodge Ram SRT-10, Dodge Motorsports, and Mopar performance parts) were alerted that another project was being considered; to design and build a fully engineered and functional prototype demonstration vehicle capable of achieving the published performance claims and being available for media track evaluation by the summer of 2004.

Design
The chassis tub of the ME Four-Twelve is carbon-fiber and aluminum honeycomb. It uses a 4130 steel rear subframe and aluminum castings. The body is lightweight carbon fiber. The low profile of the vehicle contributes to its aerodynamics, while multiple air-intakes enhance cooling. The car uses 265/35ZR19 tires in the front and 335/30ZR20 tires in the rear (on 19- and 20-inch cast-aluminum wheels, respectively). The brakes are six-piston-calipers with 16-inch discs at the front and back.

This would have made it the most powerful, as well as the fastest, road-going production vehicle at the time. The seven-speed transmission is a dual-clutch automatic transmission, with the capability of shifting gears in 200 milliseconds. Claimed acceleration from 0-60 mph is 2.9 seconds, and 0-100 mph in 6.2 seconds. Estimated top speed was claimed to be .

The ME 412's interior features leather seats, a carbon fiber dashboard, and a chrome-covered center console with a leather tilt steering wheel, and gunmetal gauges. Other features include dual-zone climate control, a premium audio system, keyless access, and a push-button start system. The roof is made of glass.

References

ME Four-twelve
Rear mid-engine, rear-wheel-drive vehicles